Lyudmil Naydenov (born ) is a former Bulgarian male volleyball player. He was part of the Bulgaria men's national volleyball team at the 1994 FIVB Volleyball Men's World Championship and 1996 Summer Olympics. He played for Olympiacos in Greece.

Clubs
 Olympiacos Piraeus (1994)

References

1970 births
Living people
Bulgarian men's volleyball players
Place of birth missing (living people)
Olympiacos S.C. players
Volleyball players at the 1996 Summer Olympics
Olympic volleyball players of Bulgaria